Mary Whitfield (died 1795) was a British stage actress.

She was born Mary Lane, but following her marriage to John Whitfield she appeared on the stage as Mrs Whitfield. She acted in Leicester and Norwich before moving to London in 1774, where she was variously part of the Covent Garden, Drury Lane and Haymarket companies. Primarily known for her comedy roles, she also played Shakesperian parts on occasion.

References

Bibliography
 Cox, Jeffrey N. & Gamer, Michael. The Broadview Anthology of Romantic Drama. Broadview Press, 2003.
 Highfill, Philip H, Burnim, Kalman A. & Langhans, Edward A. A Biographical Dictionary of Actors, Actresses, Musicians, Dancers, Managers, and Other Stage Personnel in London, 1660-1800. SIU Press, 1973.
 Straub, Kristina, G. Anderson, Misty and O'Quinn, Daniel . The Routledge Anthology of Restoration and Eighteenth-Century Drama. Taylor & Francis,  2017.

18th-century English people
English stage actresses
British stage actresses
18th-century English actresses
18th-century British actresses
1795 deaths